ASPAC may refer to:

 Asia Pacific Network of Science and Technology Centres
 ASPAC FC